Tjong i baljan! was the 1973 edition of Sveriges Radio's Christmas Calendar. From this year, the Sveriges Radio's Christmas Calendar begun using its own theme and story, independent from Sveriges Television's Christmas Calendar.

Plot
The series follow the adventures of Grodan Boll together with Kalle Stropp, Plåt-Niklas, and the parrot Ragata. He also meets Televinken.

References

1973 radio programme debuts
1973 radio programme endings
Sveriges Radio's Christmas Calendar